The iO West (formerly known as the "ImprovOlympic West") was the Los Angeles branch of the iO in Chicago. The theater was located at 6366 Hollywood Blvd., in Hollywood, California. In addition to presenting improv and sketch comedy shows every night, the iO West had improv training classes and was the home for the Los Angeles Improv Comedy Festival. On February 24, 2018, iO West permanently ceased operations.

History 

The iO was founded in the 1980s by Del Close and Charna Halpern in Chicago. The iO approaches improvisation as an art form in and of itself; this differs from the Second City approach, where improv is used as a tool in creating sketch comedy.

In 1997, Paul Vaillancourt opened a companion theater to the iO Chicago, then "ImprovOlympic West," now iO West, in Los Angeles, California.  The theater originally took up residence at The Stella Adler Theater 6773 Hollywood Blvd., but soon moved to The Complex Theater, 6470 Santa Monica Boulevard before finally moving to the new purpose-built space on 6366 Hollywood Blvd in 2000.

iO West’s three theater spaces—the Main Stage, a two-level, 99-seat theatre, the Del Close Experimental Black Box 70-seat Theater, and the 40-seat Loft Space black box theatre—feature various stand-up, sketch, and improv shows nightly. iO West's training center offers long-form improv classes year-round. The iO West is also involved in the annual Los Angeles Improv Comedy Festival.

iO West's Artistic Directors are Colleen Doyle and Zach Huddleston.

iO West's Musical Director is Eric Schackne.  Former Musical Directors include Andrew Melton and George Caleodis.

Closure
On February 13, 2018, iO Chicago co-founder Charna Halpern announced via Twitter that the theater would close permanently on February 24, 2018. As of 2020, the venue space remains vacant.

References

External links
 
 The iO - The Original Chicago Theater
 Opening Night: The Musical - iO West's Longest Running Musical Long-Form Improv Show
 Trophy Wife - The Official Site for Harold Team Masters, Trophy Wife
 Top Story! Weekly - iO West's award-winning sketch comedy show - brand new every Sunday night at 8 based on the events of the previous seven days

Improvisational theatre
Theatres in Hollywood, Los Angeles